Horns Nek Pass is situated in the Gauteng province of South Africa, on the metropolitan road M17, within the urban area of Pretoria in the Tshwane Municipality. The pass crosses the Magaliesberg mountain range after a gradual and winding ascent of approximately 2 kilometers from the southern side.  There is very little slope along the northern approach.

Mountain passes of Gauteng